All Saints Church is a redundant Anglican church in the village of Wordwell, Suffolk, England.  It is recorded in the National Heritage List for England as a designated Grade I listed building, and is under the care of the Churches Conservation Trust.  It stands in a small community alongside the B1106 road between Bury St Edmunds and Brandon.

History
The church dates from about 1100.  During the 14th and 15th centuries new windows were installed to replace the 12th-century lancet windows.  A porch was added in about 1500.  By 1757 the church was in a "run down" condition, but it had been "put into good order" by 1829.  Later in the 19th century a restoration was carried out between 1857 and 1866 by S. S. Teulon.  This included work on the west front, the bellcote, the porch, the priest's doorway, the roofs, the pulpit and the reredos.

Architecture

Exterior
All Saints is constructed in flint rubble, with freestone dressings.  The roofs are tiled, and the porch is timber.  Its plan is simple, consisting of a nave with a south porch, a chancel, and a bellcote at the west end.  The church contains Norman features, while the windows added later are in Decorated style.  The north and south doorways are Norman with round-headed arches; they are identical in form, and have Saxon influences.  The tympanum of the south doorway contains a pair of lions with dog-like features surrounded by foliage.  The north doorway is blocked, and its tympanum contains two human figures, one holding a ring.  There is a grid-like object between them.  It has been suggested that they represent Saint Catherine and her wheel, and Saint Lawrence with a gridiron.

Interior
The chancel arch is also Norman, as is the circular font.  The benches date from the 15th century and have carvings.  All the bench ends have poppyheads. Some of the benches have additional carvings, including representations of animals.  One bench is carved on its back with wild boars, and figures having human faces but animal bodies.  The rest of the fittings date from the 1888 restoration.

See also
List of churches preserved by the Churches Conservation Trust in the East of England

References

Grade I listed churches in Suffolk
Church of England church buildings in Suffolk
English churches with Norman architecture
English Gothic architecture in Suffolk
Gothic Revival architecture in Suffolk
Churches completed in 1866
Churches preserved by the Churches Conservation Trust
19th-century Church of England church buildings
1866 establishments in England